Bud W. Brutsman (born May 6, 1970) is a television show creator, executive producer, and the President of Brentwood Communications International.
His best known productions include Overhaulin' and Rides for the Learning Channel (TLC), and Living with Ed for Planet Green. Brutsman was also one of the creators of King of the Cage, garnering attention on Pay-Per-View and worldwide video sales. , Brutsman is involved in the mixed martial arts organization, Shark Fights.

Professional background 
Brutsman's first project was producing a country line dancing video in conjunction with Denim and Diamonds, a country dance club in Los Angeles and Dallas. He successfully sold the distribution rights of the video to a company in California and began creating television shows. In 1997, Brutsman established an independent television production company, which he named Brentwood Communications International, Inc. (BCII).

Military genre
Brutsman has produced several shows focusing on the U.S. military. Some of these shows include the History of Navy SEALs, Special Operations, U.S. Customs; The Complete History of Green Berets; and Inside the Britannic. He was additionally approached by a group of Navy SEALs with a consultant company outside of the military, which resulted in producing several military training videos. His documentaries have been shown on The History Channel and Discovery Channel, and sold worldwide.

In 2006, Brutsman and BCII created a U.S. Military corporate sponsorship program for a Marine platoon stationed in Iraq and their families back home. He oversaw efforts to collect exercise equipment, DVDs, magazines, and other supplies to be sent to the troops overseas, as well as organizing events and functions for the troops' families.

Filmography 
Executive producer
 1990: Rock-N-Roll Legends Series
 1998: Natural Disasters
 1999: The Complete History of the Navy Seals
 1999: Femme Fatales
 1999: Hollywood Hall of Fame
 2000: Action Heroes
 2000: Cheating Las Vegas
 2000: The History of the Green Berets
 2000: Young Hollywood Superstars
 2001: U.S. Customs: Special Agents
 2001: Special Operations (Four-part military series)
 2001: Hollywood Raw
 2002: Elvis and June: A Love Story
 2002: Inside the Britannic
 2000–2003: King of the Cage (V. 1–24) Live PPV
 2004: Rides
 2006: CES: Consumer Electronics Show
 2006: Extreme Yachts Special
 2006-2013: Hot Rod TV
 2006: Payback
 2007: Forza Motorsports Showdown (mini series)
 2007: Get Out Way Out 2007: Stress Test 2007–2008: Celebrity Rides (Burt Reynolds)
 2004–2020: Overhaulin' 2008: Chasing Baja (documentary)
 2008: Celebrity Rides (Kevin Dillon)
 2008–2009: Celebrity Rides (Jay Leno)
 2008–2009: Hot Import Nights 2008–2009: Livin' the Low Life 2009-2014: Optima Ultimate Street Car Invitational 2009: Raptor Documentary 2009: Celebrity Rides (Steve McQueen)
 2009: Jet Set: with Jay Leno 2007–2010: Living with Ed 2009–2011: Garage Mahal 2009–2015: Car Crazy 2010: Midnight Munchies 2010: Xtreme Eating 2011: American Trucker 2011: Punk Payback with Bas Rutten
 2011: Shark Fights 2011: Esquire: Ultimate Bachelor Pad 2011: Single with 7 2011: The BOSS is Back 2011-2012 Inside West Coast Customs 2012-2019: Extreme RVs 2012: Naturally Beautiful 2012: Hollywood For Sale 2012: Turbine Cowboys 2012: Magic Outlaws 2012: Extreme Yachts 2013: Backroad Gold 2013: Big Cool Stuff 2013: Extreme Doomsday Vehicles 2013: Extreme Doomsday Bunkers 2013: Extreme Factories 2013: Extreme Toys 2013: Rock My RV 2013: Viper: Soul Survivor 2013: R U Faster Than a Redneck? 2014-2016: Flippin RVs 2014-2021: SEMA Battle of the Builders 2014-2021: World Desert Championship 2015: Fit, Fabulous and Famous 2015: RV Nation 2015: Animal Storm Squad 2016: Everest Air 2016: Classic Cars 2016-2017: Competition Ready 2016-2021 Road to the Battle of the Builders 2017: Race of Champions 2017: Beachin' RVs 2017: Race of Champions 2017: Beachin' RVs 2016-2018: Roadworthy 2019: Ignite Your Life 2019: Inside Overhaulin' 2020: Ready for Battle with AJ 2020: High Performance House Calls 2019-2021: The Fixers 2021: Expedition: Back to the Future 2021: Fully Torqued''

References 

1970 births
Living people
American television producers